Vicente Rodríguez (1959 – 1 August 2021) was a Paraguayan politician who served as a Deputy from 2018 until his death in 2021, and before then as Governor of San Pedro from 2013 to 2018.

References

1959 births
2021 deaths
Paraguayan politicians
Members of the Chamber of Deputies of Paraguay
Governors of San Pedro Department, Paraguay
People from San Pedro Department, Paraguay